Survivor: Marquesas is the fourth season of the American CBS competitive reality television series Survivor. The season filmed from November 12, 2001, through December 20, 2001, and premiered on February 28, 2002. Hosted by Jeff Probst, it consisted of the usual 39 days of gameplay with 16 competitors. The Marquesas Islands in French Polynesia were initially selected as a backup location for Survivor. The original location, Jordan, was discounted as a result of the September 11 attacks and the political situation in the Middle East.

Vecepia Towery was named Sole Survivor after defeating runner-up Neleh Dennis by a jury vote of 4–3. This was the first season where the contestants were not given any initial food, water, or matches. Also, the rules of individual immunity were changed so that a contestant who won immunity in a challenge was able to give it to another contestant. A new tiebreaker format was developed in preference of the past-used tiebreaker involving previous votes cast. The controversial new Purple Rock tiebreaker was used, resulting in the ousting of Paschal English, then with no votes against him. This was also the first season to have final three and then final two contestants within the same gender.

Overview

Survivor is a reality television show created by Mark Burnett and Charlie Parsons and based on the Swedish show Expedition Robinson. The series follows a number of participants who are isolated in a remote location, where they must provide food, fire, and shelter for themselves. Every three days, one participant is removed from the series by majority vote, with challenges being held to give a reward (ranging from living and food-related prizes to a car) and immunity from being voted off the show. The last remaining player is awarded a prize of $1,000,000.

The season was filmed from November 12, 2001, through December 20, 2001, and premiered on February 28, 2002. Originally set to be held in Jordan, it was moved as a result of the September 11 attacks, and the political situation in the Middle East. It was such moved to the Marquesas Islands in French Polynesia.

Contestants
The contestants were divided into two tribes: Maraamu and Rotu (Marquesan for 'Wind' and 'Rain', respectively). They later merged into the Soliantu tribe (a word created by competitors Kathy-Vavrick O'Brien and "Boston Rob" Mariano which they intended to mean "Sacred Allegiance to the Sun").

Future appearances
Kathy Vavrick-O'Brien and Rob Mariano competed again in Survivor: All-Stars. Mariano later participated for three more seasons: Survivor: Heroes vs. Villains, Survivor: Redemption Island, and Survivor: Winners at War. These appearances made him the first castaway to play five seasons of Survivor. He also appeared on Survivor: Island of the Idols serving as a mentor alongside Sandra Diaz-Twine.

Outside Survivor, Mariano competed on The Amazing Race 7 with his fiancée and fellow Survivor alumna Amber Brkich; the couple, now married, returned for The Amazing Race All-Stars.

Season summary
The sixteen contestants were divided into two preselected tribes of eight, Rotu and Maraamu. The Rotu tribe prospered as a unified, hard-working group, while the Maraamu tribe quickly became divided between those who worked, led by Hunter, and those who didn't, led by Rob. Rob's faction dominated the votes, resulting in Maraamu losing every single challenge. On day 10, a random tribe shuffle sent Rob and his allies Sean and Vecepia to Rotu, while Paschal, Neleh, and Kathy joined Maraamu. While Rob seemed like an easy choice to eliminate, original Rotu member John aligned with fellow original Rotu members Tammy, Robert, and Zoe to eliminate Gabriel, the fifth remaining original Rotu member, for being strategically apathetic.

The tribes merged with ten players remaining: seven original Rotu and three original Maraamu. Rob attempted to align with Kathy, Paschal, and Neleh to overthrow John's alliance, but was unsuccessful and consequently eliminated. However, Paschal and Neleh later wisen up to their inferior positions within the Rotu alliance, aligning with Vecepia, Sean, and Kathy to take control of the game, systematically voting off John and his allies.

With only the five remaining, Kathy found herself caught between the two pairs of Neleh and Paschal, and Vecepia and Sean. She aligned with the former to eliminate Sean, but Vecepia won immunity at the final four. Knowing Paschal and Neleh would not vote for each other, Kathy publicly approached Vecepia at Tribal Council about aligning and taking each other to the final Tribal Council. Vecepia agreed to the deal, and they agreed to both vote for Neleh that night. With the vote being tied and deadlocked for the first time, the new rules for breaking a tie came into effect as everyone (save for the immune Vecepia) would reach into a bag and pull out a colored rock, with the purple rock meaning elimination. Paschal drew the purple rock, resulting in his elimination despite having no votes cast against him throughout the game. At the final Immunity Challenge, Vecepia went back on her deal with Kathy, agreeing to let Neleh win immunity in exchange that Neleh would vote off Kathy. Neleh agreed and Kathy became the final member of the jury.

At the Final Tribal Council, both Vecepia and Neleh were lambasted for hiding behind religion while still backstabbing the jurors. However, Paschal praised both finalists. Neleh was praised for her honesty and close strategic and personal bond with Paschal, but also criticized for not starting to play the game until day 24. Vecepia was praised for her under-the-radar strategic and social game despite being in the minority, but criticized for using religion to betray Kathy the night before. Ultimately, Vecepia was awarded the title of Sole Survivor in a 4–3 vote due to playing from day 1-39.

In the case of multiple tribes or castaways who win reward or immunity, they are listed in order of finish, or alphabetically where it was a team effort; where one castaway won and invited others, the invitees are in brackets.

Episodes

Voting history

Notes

Reception

The season was ultimately met with mixed to negative reception, primarily due to the cast being seen as fairly forgettable, and the final two being perceived as having poor gameplay. However, the use of the Purple Rock tiebreaker has been one of the most polarizing moments in Survivor history, with critics divided on whether or not it was an unfair solution to a tie, or if it made for entertaining television. Host Jeff Probst was not fond of this season, ranking it his second-to-least favorite (as of season 19). Probst stated, "Dramatically, I just felt like Marquesas never got any momentum, and by the time you got to the final two with Neleh and Vecepia — I'm sleeping." He also said that the environment in Marquesas was the most brutally unpleasant in the show's history due to the biting no-no flies. However, Survivor columnist Dalton Ross of Entertainment Weekly gave this season a positive review, ranking it 17th out of 40 and calling it, "an underrated season that saw the first totem pole shake-up: where people on the bottom got together to overthrow those on the top. Yes, it was a weak final two, but it also had a woman peeing on a guy's hand. Plus: Purple rock!!!"

The exit of John Carroll is widely considered to be the foundation of modern Survivor strategy by columnists and fans alike. Joe Reid of The Wire ranked it among the bottom 10, at #19, in 2014, saying that Rob had "a comparatively ignominious debut" despite his future reputation, called John "a preening dyngus," and said that "Vecepia backing into a victory because she didn't piss anyone off was anti-climactic." "The Purple Rock Podcast" ranked Marquesas 27th out of 40, saying that although the season "gets bonus points" for featuring the Purple Rock, the season "sort of limps to the finish line" in its storytelling and character narratives. In 2015, a poll by Rob Has a Podcast ranked Marquesas 18th out of 30 with Rob Cesternino ranking this season 21st. This was updated in 2021 during Cesternino's podcast, Survivor All-Time Top 40 Rankings, ranking 22nd out of 40. In 2020, Inside Survivor ranked this season 9th out of 40 saying that it "is a season that deserves more respect. Not only does it have some incredible characters and hilarious moments, but it’s an important, game-changing season."

A small increase in the average number of viewers was observed for the season compared to the prior season, Survivor: Africa.

Purple Rock controversy
Paschal's elimination at the final four sparked controversy in the game of Survivor. Starting in Marquesas, if the tribe could not reach a unanimous decision as to who should be voted off within an allotted time, contestants who did not have immunity would pull different colored rocks from a sack. Whoever chose the odd-colored rock (in this case, purple) would be eliminated. The contestants receiving the most votes (in this situation, Kathy and Neleh) also become immune. However, at this tribal council, Neleh and Kathy were also forced to choose rocks where they should have been immune, which in theory would have eliminated Paschal by default. Though Paschal chose the purple rock and was eliminated anyway, it is speculated that the fire-making challenge (which would involve only Neleh and Kathy) should have been used in this case and that production was in error by using the rock drawing tiebreaker as there were four contestants remaining. This theory was supported by host Jeff Probst, when he later admitted that using the purple rock tiebreaker was a mistake at this point in the game, because the formula behind it was impossible to apply fairly with only four players left.

Following Marquesas, the drawing of rocks to break a tie would not occur again for more than eleven years, when in the twenty-seventh season, Survivor: Blood vs. Water, Katie Collins drew the odd-colored rock at the final six tribal council and went to Redemption Island (as the twist was in play). The odd-colored rock in this draw was white while the others were black. The rock draw also appeared in the thirty-third season, Survivor: Millennials vs. Gen X. A tied-vote at the final ten resulted in Jessica Lewis being eliminated after drawing the sole black rock (with the other rocks being white). Probst stated in an interview during Blood vs. Water that the tiebreaker has been used so scarcely that they did not take consistency of the colors into account.

References

Further reading

External links
 Official CBS Survivor Marquesas Website

04
2002 American television seasons
Television shows filmed in French Polynesia
Impact of the September 11 attacks on television